Simon Khan (born 16 June 1972) is an English professional golfer who plays on the European Tour.

Khan turned professional in 1991 but spent many years struggling to establish his tournament career. His first full season on the European Tour was 2002 and his first European Tour win came at the 2004 Celtic Manor Wales Open. In 2006 he finished second at the prestigious BMW Championship to earn €472,220, which was his biggest prize cheque up to that time.

His best year-end ranking on the European Order of Merit has been 25th in 2006 and 2010. He has featured in the top 100 of the Official World Golf Rankings. After losing his tour card in 2009, Khan was a medalist at the Qualifying School tournament. In 2010 he won the BMW PGA Championship, earning €750,000 and securing his Tour card for five years in the process.

Khan produced another fine run at the BMW PGA Championship in 2013, when he recorded the second runner-up finish of his career, to add to his 2010 victory, at Wentworth. After finishing at 10 under par, Khan entered a three-man playoff alongside Matteo Manassero and Marc Warren. In the playoff, Warren was eliminated at the first extra hole and after matching pars and birdies, Khan was defeated on the fourth extra hole by Manassero. After a good drive, Khan knocked his second shot into the water and could only make a bogey six and Manassero after two fine shots onto the green, two-putted for the victory.

Professional wins (5)

European Tour wins (2)

European Tour playoff record (1–1)

Other wins (3)
1996 Essex Open
1999 East Region Championship
2000 Essex Open

Playoff record
Challenge Tour playoff record (0–1)

Results in major championships

Note: Khan never played in the Masters Tournament.

CUT = missed the half-way cut
"T" = tied

Results in World Golf Championships

"T" = Tied

Team appearances
Professional
Seve Trophy (representing Great Britain & Ireland): 2013

See also
2009 European Tour Qualifying School graduates

References

External links

English male golfers
European Tour golfers
People from Chingford
People from Epping
English people of South Asian descent
1972 births
Living people